GABA tea (other names: Gabaron, Jia Wu Long cha, Jing Bai Long cha, 佳叶龙茶) is tea that has undergone a special oxygen-free fermentation process, and as a result has accumulated GABA in tea leaves. This technology has been created in Japan. Dr. Tsushida and his collaborators at the former MAFF National Research Institute of Tea (currently the National Institute of Vegetables and Tea Science) began developing GABA-rich tea in 1984 and successfully produced a new type tea in which almost all glutamic acid has been converted to GABA without changing the content of catechin or caffeine. They discovered a new method of tea fermentation, and found that a large amount of GABA accumulated in green tea through six to ten hours in anaerobic (oxygen-free) condition of fermentation. Oxygen in the atmosphere fermentation chamber was replaced with nitrogen. They examined further the GABA content of green, oolong and black tea made under anaerobic condition and found that GABA accumulated in all teas. Japanese scientists have shown great interest and attention to this new technology and in the late 1980s in Japan, this GABA tea was actively distributed as a commercial product for people with hypertension. It was found that the chemically synthesized GABA reduces blood pressure in experimental animals and humans. Further research demonstrated that GABA tea was also able to reduce the blood pressure in experimental animals and humans.

Traditionally it was thought that exogenous GABA did not penetrate the blood–brain barrier, however more current research indicates that it may be possible, or that exogenous GABA (i.e. in the form of nutritional supplements) could exert GABAergic effects on the enteric nervous system which in turn stimulate endogenous GABA production.

References

 Sheng-Dun Lin, et al., Bioactive components and antioxidant properties of g-aminobutyric acid (GABA) tea leaves. LWT – Food Science and Technology Volume 46, Issue 1, April 2012, pp. 64–70
 Hsueh Fang Wang, et al., Comparison of bioactive components in GABA tea and green tea produced in Taiwan. Department of Food Science, National Chung Hsing University, 250 KuoKuang Road, Taichung, Taiwan 402, ROC. Food Chemistry (Impact Factor: 3.39). 06/2006; 96(4):648–653. DOI: 10.1016/j.foodchem.2005.02.046

Tea